The Diocese of San Rafael is a Roman Catholic diocese in San Rafael, Argentina. It came into existence on 10 April 1961.

Bishops

Past and present ordinaries

Raúl Francisco Primatesta (1961–1965), appointed Archbishop of Córdoba (Cardinal in 1973)
Jorge Carlos Carreras (1965–1969) appointed Bishop of San Justo
Oscar Félix Villena (1970–1972) 
León Kruk (1973–1991) 
Jesús Arturo Roldán (1991–1996) 
Guillermo José Garlatti (1997–2003), appointed Archbishop of Bahía Blanca
Eduardo Maria Taussig (2004–2022)
Carlos María Domínguez (2023–present)

Other priest of this diocese who became bishop
Pedro Daniel Martínez Perea, appointed Coadjutor Bishop of San Luis in 2009

References

External links
Diocese of San Rafael, Catholic Hierarchy 

San Rafael
San Rafael
San Rafael
San Rafael
1961 establishments in Argentina